Milda garretti is a species of sea snail, a marine gastropod mollusk in the family Pyramidellidae, the pyrams and their allies.

Description
The shell has a yellowish color with chestnut colored nebulous longitudinal striations. The whorls of the teleoconch are flattened. The suture is channeled. The body whorl has a peripheral sulcus. The columella is three-plicate, the upper fold very strong, lower ones approximate and more oblique. The length of the shell varies between 10 mm and 20 mm.

Distribution
This marine species occurs off Thailand, the Philippines and Indonesia.

References

External links
 World Register of Marine Species
 

Pyramidellidae
Gastropods described in 1886